Meiliana Jauhari (born 7 May 1984) is a badminton player from Indonesia. She won the women's doubles title at the 2009 and 2013 Indonesian National Championships. Jauhari participated at the 2010 Asian Games and 2012 Summer Olympics.

Career 
Jauhari trained at the Djarum badminton club, and has joined the club since 2002.

Jauhari competed in the women's doubles in the BWF Super Series at the 2008 Indonesia Super Series, the 2009 Malaysia Super Series, and the 2009 Korea Open Super Series with her partner, Shendy Puspa Irawati. She won a BWF Grand Prix title at the 2008 Vietnam Open.

Partnered with Greysia Polii in the women's doubles, surprisingly, the first time they played together, they beat Korean pair Ha Jung-eun and Lee Kyung-won, 21-14, 21-12. At the 2010 All England Super Series, they reached the quarterfinals after defeating 4th-seeded Malaysian pair Chin Eei Hui and Wong Pei Tty in straight sets. In the quarterfinals, they played a rubber set against Pan Pan and Tian Qing from China but lost 23-25, 21-17, 17-21. They played at the Uber Cup but they lost to Ma Jin and Wang Xiaoli of China in the semifinals. They were the runners-up of the 2010 Macau Open Grand Prix Gold after losing to Cheng Wen-hsing and Chien Yu-chin of Chinese Taipei in the rubber games.

At the 2012 Summer Olympics,  Jauhari and her partner Polii, along with Jung Kyung-eun and Kim Ha-na, Ha Jung-eun and Kim Min-jung of South Korea, and Wang Xiaoli and Yu Yang of China were disqualified from the competition for "not using one's best efforts to win a match" and "conducting oneself in a manner that is clearly abusive or detrimental to the sport" following matches the previous evening during which they were accused of trying to lose in order to manipulate the draw. Jauhari and her partner Greysia Polii played against South Korea's Ha Jung-eun and Kim Min-jung.  Indonesia filed an appeal to the case,  but it was withdrawn.

Achievements

Southeast Asian Games 
Women's doubles

BWF Grand Prix (2 titles, 8 runners-up) 
The BWF Grand Prix had two levels, the Grand Prix and Grand Prix Gold. It was a series of badminton tournaments sanctioned by the Badminton World Federation (BWF) and played between 2007 and 2017. The World Badminton Grand Prix has been sanctioned by the International Badminton Federation from 1983 to 2006.

Women's doubles

  BWF Grand Prix Gold tournament
  BWF Grand Prix tournament

BWF International Challenge/Series (11 titles, 6 runners-up) 
Women's doubles

Mixed doubles

  BWF International Challenge tournament
  BWF International Series tournament

Performance timeline

National team 
 Senior level

Individual competitions 
 Senior level

References

External links 
 

1984 births
Living people
Sportspeople from Jakarta
Indonesian female badminton players
Badminton players at the 2012 Summer Olympics
Olympic badminton players of Indonesia
Badminton players at the 2010 Asian Games
Asian Games bronze medalists for Indonesia
Asian Games medalists in badminton
Medalists at the 2010 Asian Games
Competitors at the 2009 Southeast Asian Games
Southeast Asian Games silver medalists for Indonesia
Southeast Asian Games bronze medalists for Indonesia
Southeast Asian Games medalists in badminton
21st-century Indonesian women